Nikos Korovesis (born 10 August 1991) is a Greek professional footballer who plays as a left-back for Super League 2 club Apollon Smyrnis.

Career
Born in Chalkida, Korovesis began playing football with Apollon Smyrnis.
Nikos Korovesis will wear the jersey of PAOK from summer 2015 along with Charis Charisis. The two aces will be two of several acquisitions of PAOK in summer season.  The players were about to sign to PAOK with the consent of the administration of PAS Giannina. According to absolutely reliable information is an agreement between the two major shareholders. Both are agreed on all the basics, with PAOK, but however nothing is announced yet.

On 25 June 2015, Korovesis signed a three years' contract with PAOK for an undisclosed fee.
In summer 2016, PAOK officially announced that the winger was not in club's plans for the 2016–17 season. On 31 January 2017 he was loaned on PAS Giannina for six months. On 3 August 2017, he signed a two years' contract with Platanias with an undisclosed fee. On 29 March 2018, the administration of struggling Platanias officially announced the mutual termination of Nikos Korovesis contract. On 12 June 2018, Korovesis joined OFI Crete on a free transfer. On 9 December 2018, he scored his first goal for the club in an important 3–1 home win against Panathinaikos, only the second of the season.

On 29 May 2019, he signed a contract extension until the summer of 2021.

Career statistics

Club

References

External links

1991 births
Living people
Greek footballers
Association football defenders
Super League Greece players
Apollon Smyrnis F.C. players
PAS Giannina F.C. players
PAOK FC players
Platanias F.C. players
OFI Crete F.C. players
Footballers from Chalcis